Ahmed Ibrahim al-Fagih (Arabic: أحمد إبراهيم الفقيه ’áħmad 'Ibrāhīm al-faqīh) (December 28, 1942 – April 30, 2019) was a Libyan novelist, playwright, essayist, journalist and diplomat.  He began writing short stories at an early age publishing them in Libyan newspapers and magazines. He gained recognition in 1965 when his first collection of short stories There Is No Water in the Sea (Arabic: البحر لا ماء فيه) won him the highest award sponsored by the Royal Commission of Fine Arts in Libya. Fagih wrote many more books in different genres, including short stories, novels, plays, essays, among them Gazelles (play), Evening Visitor (play), Gardens of the Night Trilogy (novels), The Valley of Ashes (novel), and his 12-volume epic novel Maps of the Soul, which had its first three volumes translated into English and published by DARF Publishers in UK in 2014.

Fagih held several diplomatic posts representing Libya, in London, Athens, Bucharest and Cairo. He lived and worked between Cairo and Tripoli.

Biography 
Ahmed Fagih was born in 1942 in Mizda, a small oasis town south of Tripoli, where he entered school and studied until his teens before he migrated to Tripoli in 1957 to pursue higher studies and begin his writing career. Fagih travelled in 1962 to Egypt to study journalism with the help of a UNESCO sponsorship program, returning later to Tripoli to work as a journalist. In 1965 he published his first collection of short stories titled There Is No Water in the Sea (Arabic: البحر لا ماء فيه), which won him the highest award sponsored by the Royal Commission of Fine Arts in Libya. In the late 1960s he travelled to London to study drama and theatre until 1972. After returning from Britain he was appointed the director of the National Institute of Music and Drama. In 1972 Fagih became the editor of the influential cultural and literary newspaper The Cultural Weekly (Arabic: الاسبوع الثقافي al-Usbūʻ al-thaqāfi), which featured many new Libyan writers. During this period he founded The New Theatre play and drama group through which he directed/performed in several plays.

Fagih became the head of the Department of Arts and Literature at the Libyan Ministry of Information and Culture and in 1978 was one of the founders of the Union of Libyan Writers and was elected as its first Secretary General, later travelling back to London to take a diplomatic position as the press counsellor at the Libyan Embassy in Britain, during which he established the Arab Cultural Trust, which launched a cultural quarterly magazine named Azure becoming its editor-in-chief.

In 1983 he was awarded a Doctorate of Philosophy PhD from the Faculty of Arts of The University of Edinburgh submitting a thesis on 'The Libyan short story'. He published his three part novel Garden of The Night in 1991, which won the best creative work of Beirut Book Fair. In 2000 he edited an English anthology of 13 short stories by Libyan writers.

Works

Short stories 
 There Is No Water in the Sea (1965) البحر لا ماء فيه
 Fasten Your Seatbelts اربطوا أحزمة المقاعد
 The Stars Vanished So Where Are You? أختفت النجوم فأين أنت؟
 A Woman of Light إمرأة من ضوء
 Five Beetles Trying the Tree خمس خنافس تحاكم الشجرة
 Mirrors of Venice مرايا فينسيا
 30 Short Stories ثلاثون قصة قصيرة

Novels 
 Homeless Rats فئران بلا جحور 
 Valley of Ashes حقول الرماد
 Shall Present You With Another City سأهبك مدينة أخرى
 These Are The Borders of My Kingdom هذه تخوم مملكتي
 A Tunnel Lit by A Woman نفق تضيئه أمرأة واحدة
 The Trilogy (Garden of The Night) الثلاثية الروائية
 Maps of The Soul, an epic work of fiction in 12 volumes خرائط الروح

Plays 
 Gazelles الغزالات

See also 
 List of Libyan novelists 
 List of Arab novelists
 Libyan literature

References

External links 
 Banipal Biography page of Ahmed Fagih
 Maps of The Soul from DARF Publishers

Libyan novelists
1942 births
2019 deaths
20th-century Libyan writers